Marlon LeBlanc (born October 6, 1976) is an American soccer coach who is currently head coach of Philadelphia Union II.

Career
Raised in East Windsor, New Jersey, LeBlanc played prep soccer at Hightstown High School before playing for the Penn State Nittany Lions men's soccer team/

He was formerly the head men's soccer coach at West Virginia University. He was named the 2006 Soccer America Coach of the Year, leading the team to a 15-3-3 record. LeBlanc led the Mountaineers to six NCAA tournament appearances, including a Sweet Sixteen appearance in 2007, 1 BIG EAST Championship and 2 MAC Championships. He previously served as an assistant coach at Penn State University from 2001 to 2005, leading the program as interim head coach for seven games in 2002. As an assistant, Penn State went to four out of five NCAA tournaments.

Collegiate Head coaching record

Professional Head coaching record

References

External links
http://www.msnsportsnet.com/staffDirectory.cfm?func=view&staffID=2179

Living people
Penn State Nittany Lions men's soccer coaches
West Virginia Mountaineers men's soccer coaches
People from East Windsor, New Jersey
1976 births
American soccer coaches
Hightstown High School alumni
Soccer players from New Jersey
Sportspeople from Mercer County, New Jersey
Penn State Nittany Lions men's soccer players
Philadelphia Union II coaches
Association footballers not categorized by position
Association football players not categorized by nationality